Colby, Kansas is a center of media in northwestern Kansas. The following is a list of media outlets based in the city.

Print

Newspapers
Colby Free Press, four days a week
Trojan Express, Colby Community College student newspaper, bi-weekly

Radio
The following radio stations are licensed to and/or broadcast from Colby:

AM
One AM radio station broadcasts from Colby:  KXXX, which broadcasts on 790 AM, playing a Classic Country format.

FM

Television
Colby is in the Wichita-Hutchinson, Kansas television market. The following television stations are licensed to and/or broadcast from Colby:

References

Mass media in Kansas